{{DISPLAYTITLE:C29H44O3}}
The molecular formula C29H44O3 (molar mass: 440.66 g/mol) may refer to:

 Estradiol undecylate, an estrogen medication
 Mesterolone cipionate, a synthetic anabolic–androgenic steroid and an androgen ester

Molecular formulas